Scouting in the Congo can refer to:

 Scouting in the Democratic Republic of the Congo
 Scouting in the Republic of the Congo